The Molesalam are a Muslim Rajput community found in the state of Gujarat in India. They also refer to themselves as Molesalam Thakur and sometimes Molesalam Girasia (Grasiya).

The Molesalams were targeted in an oppressive shuddhi ‘purification’ campaign launched by the Arya Samaj Hindu organization in 1908. In March of 1926, the Molesalams held an anti-shuddhi conference in Charotar, led by a prominent leader of their community and member of the Bombay Legislative Assembly, Sardar Naharsinhji Ishvarsinhji.

References

Muslim communities of Gujarat
Rajput clans of Gujarat